Sentimentalement vôtre is the seventeenth French studio album by French singer Mireille Mathieu. It was released by Philips and published by Phonogram. It is the seventh studio album released by Philips in France. This album contains a very famous song in France, Mille colombes. Norman Parkinson was the photographer.

Track listing

Singles
Two singles appeared from this album in gatefold format in France : 
1977 Amour défendu
1977 Mille colombes

Charts

Certifications and sales

References 

1977 albums
Philips Records albums
French-language albums
Mireille Mathieu albums